Washington Crossing National Cemetery is a United States National Cemetery located in Upper Makefield Township, in Bucks County, Pennsylvania.

Bucks County Congressman Patrick Murphy has been credited with securing federal funding for the cemetery after decades of congressional inaction.



Notable burials
 George Benton (1933–2011), former US Army soldier and professional boxer
 Michael G. Fitzpatrick (1963–2020), US Representative
 Tom Gola (1933–2014), former US Army soldier and professional basketball player
 Harold Johnson (1928–2015), Hall of Fame professional boxer
 Sara Seegar (1914–1990), actress

See also 
 List of Pennsylvania cemeteries

References

External links 
 National Cemetery Administration
 Washington Crossing National Cemetery
 
 

2009 establishments in Pennsylvania
Cemeteries in Bucks County, Pennsylvania
United States national cemeteries